Robot Wrecks is a 1941 Our Gang short comedy film directed by Edward Cahn. It was the 200th Our Gang short released (201st episode, 112th talking short, 113th talking episode, and 32nd MGM-produced episode).

Plot
Slicker sells the Our Gang kids some "invisible rays," with which they hope to power their homemade mechanical robot. Miracle of miracles, the robot not only begins to move, but actually performs several of the gang's household chores. In truth, the robot is being manipulated by Slicker's cohort Boxcar, but the kids do not learn this until their rampaging mechanical man nearly lays waste to the entire neighborhood.

Cast

The Gang
 Mickey Gubitosi as Mickey
 Darla Hood as Darla
 George McFarland as Spanky
 Billy Laughlin as Froggy
 Billie Thomas as Buckwheat

Additional cast
 Vincent Graeff as Boxcar
 Freddie Walburn as Slicker
 Margaret Bert as Froggy's Mother
 Billy Bletcher as Froggy's father / Voice of Froggy's Mother
 Emmet Vogan as Robot owner
 Giovanna Gubitosi as Onlooker at robot demonstration

See also
 Our Gang filmography

References

External links

1941 films
1941 comedy films
American black-and-white films
Films directed by Edward L. Cahn
Metro-Goldwyn-Mayer short films
Our Gang films
1941 short films
American robot films
1940s American films
1940s English-language films